Leaves of Yesteryear is the sixth full-length studio album by the Norwegian progressive metal band Green Carnation. It was released on May 8, 2020 via Season of Mist.

This album represents the return of the band after fourteen years of absence from the recording studios. It Includes the cover of the Black Sabbath ballad "Solitude", from their album Master of Reality (1971), as well as a new version of "My Dark Reflections of Life and Death" that originally appeared on their 2000 debut album, Journey to the End of the Night.

It is the first studio album with experienced Chilean drummer Jonathan Pérez (ex-Sirenia), a live band member since 2016.

Reception 

The album was met with positive reviews from music critics. Blabbermouth.net rated it with an 8 and describes it "(the band) has returned and settled into a gothic prog metal format on Leaves of Yesteryear, a solid album which is ripe with the qualities, dynamics and diversity that longtime followers would expect and crave". Licia Mapelli of Tuonela Magazine wrote an unrated yet positive track-by-track review of the album.

Background 
According to Tchort's writings in the booklet to Acoustic Verses in 2006, Green Carnation's next studio release was going to be the second part of "The Chronicles of Doom" trilogy, which began with Light of Day, Day of Darkness, and was going to be titled The Rise and Fall of Mankind, with an undetermined release date.

However, the announced album title was eventually discarded and its lyrical content was changed for unknown reasons after the group's long break. Instead, the new title and lyrics suggest a return to the band's earlier progressive doom roots, with songs composed mostly by the well-known formula of the duo of Tchort and Stein Roger Sordal.

Track listing

Personnel
Green Carnation
 Kjetil Nordhus – vocals 
 Terje Vik Schei (a.k.a. Tchort) – guitars
 Michael Smith Krumins  – guitars 
 Stein Roger Sordal – bass guitar, guitars 
 Kenneth Silden – keyboards 
 Jonathan Pérez – drums
 Bjørn "Berserk" Harstad – guitars

Recording information 
 Produced by Endre Kirkesola and Green Carnation
 Mastered at Maor Appelbaum Mastering, California, U.S.A. 
 Artwork by Niklas Sundin

References

External links

Green Carnation albums
2020 albums
Season of Mist albums